Johann Reinhard may refer to:

 Johann Reinhard I, Count of Hanau-Lichtenberg (1569–1625)
 Johann Reinhard II, Count of Hanau-Lichtenberg (1628–1666)
 Johann Reinhard III, Count of Hanau-Lichtenberg (1665–1736)
 Johann Reinhard Blum (1802–1883), German mineralogist

See also
 Johan Reinhard (born 1943), American anthropologist, archaeologist, and explorer